The following lists events in the year 2023 in Panama.

Incumbents
 President: Laurentino Cortizo
 Vice President: José Gabriel Carrizo

Events
Ongoing — COVID-19 pandemic in Panama

 15 February – Gualaca bus crash: At least 39 illegal immigrants are killed in Gualaca District, Chiriquí Province, when their bus, intended to be driven to the United States, falls off a cliff.

Sports
 Scheduled October / November – Panama at the 2023 Pan American Games

Deaths

January to March
1 February – Lucy Quintero, folk singer (born 1948).

See also

References

 
2020s in Panama
Years of the 21st century in Panama
Panama
Panama